Gulnor Sulaymanova (born 2 December 1990) is an Uzbekistani female kurash practitioner. She is a gold medalist at the 2017 Kurash World Championship which was held in Istanbul.

She represented Uzbekistan at the 2018 Asian Games and claimed gold medal in the women's individual 52kg event.

References 

1990 births
Living people
Uzbekistani female martial artists
Kurash practitioners at the 2018 Asian Games
Medalists at the 2018 Asian Games
Asian Games gold medalists for Uzbekistan
Asian Games medalists in kurash
20th-century Uzbekistani women
21st-century Uzbekistani women